Boko Haram kidnapping may refer to:

2014 Gumsuri kidnappings, the kidnapping of 172–185 villagers
Chibok schoolgirls kidnapping, the 2014 kidnapping of 276 female students
Dapchi schoolgirls kidnapping, the 2018 kidnapping of 110 female students
Malari kidnapping, the 2015 kidnapping of 40 boys and young men
Kankara kidnapping, the 2020 kidnapping of over 300 male students